Édouard Bader (26 July 1899 – 21 April 1983) was a French rugby union player who competed in the 1920 Summer Olympics. In 1920 he won the silver medal as member of the French team.

References

External links
profile

1899 births
1983 deaths
French rugby union players
Olympic rugby union players of France
Rugby union players at the 1920 Summer Olympics
Olympic silver medalists for France
France international rugby union players
Medalists at the 1920 Summer Olympics